The Nova Project, also simply known as Nova, is a small public alternative high school in Seattle, Washington, in the Seattle Public School District. Nova is a social justice oriented school that embraces differences and self-expression. Its aim is to be a "democratically governed learning community of broadly educated, creative, and independent thinkers who work collaboratively and demonstrate a high degree of individual responsibility." There are no grades or tests. Students receive credit based on the effort and competencies the student demonstrates. There is no formal attendance at Nova however students are strongly encouraged to attend class. The Nova community wants students and staff to attend classes and events because they want to be there and feel as though what they are learning and contributing is worth while.

About

Nova was founded by a group of students, parents and teachers in 1970. The curriculum is multidisciplinary and project-oriented, with an emphasis on individualized learning contracts, internships and community service. Nova functions through student-run, teacher-supported committees that decide school budgeting, the hiring and review process of staff, discussion forums, orientation of new students, and cultural affairs.

The credit system is competency-based which means students receive either full, partial or no credit. Each student picks a teacher to be their coordinator to design a personal learning plan and graduate time. At Nova you do not need to graduate after the traditional number of years of high school in the United States which is four years. Some students graduate in as little as two years and other students take five or six. Nova classes include every grade (9-12). Class size varies but they tend to be quite small ranging from ten to twenty students however some classes can be smaller for example classes for students with special needs or lab based science classes. Nova students have the option of creating "independent contracts" with their teachers to earn credit for extracurricular projects and activities. It is common for Nova students to co-teach classes with their teachers, generating curriculum and building facilitation skills in line with Nova's student-led philosophy. Like other Seattle Public Schools students, Nova students may participate in the Running Start program and take classes at a local community college.

Nova is a safe space for students of all identities, sexual orientations, ethnicities, religions, backgrounds and is an advocate for mental health awareness. Nova has worked on creating their own Teen Health Center specific for their students which is actively inclusive to their diverse demographics. There are many days dedicated for speakers and social justice work. Nova has Consent Day, Racial Justice Day, Gender Tea and much more.

Notable staff, alumni and former students

Reiko Aylesworth, actress best known from the TV series 24
Stephen Funk, the first U.S. military service member to publicly refuse to deploy to the US war in Iraq
Bonnie McKee, singer and songwriter
Rose McGowan, actress and singer
Matthew Lawton, writer and comedian
Stefan Gruber, animator and performance artist
Eve Rickert, co-author of More Than Two
Brisa Roché, musician
Theodore Cecil DeCelles, electronic musician and author

See also
Alternative school
BIPOC+ rights
LGBTQ+
Social justice
Disability rights

References

External links
NovaKnows (Nova's student-created website)
Seattle Public Schools - Nova High School

Alternative education
Alternative schools in the United States
Central District, Seattle
Public high schools in Washington (state)
Seattle Public Schools